Duke Ernest of Bavaria (born 13 June 1500 in Munich – died: 7 December 1560 in Glatz) was the Administrator of the dioceses of Passau and Salzburg and pledge lord of Glatz.

Background and education 
Ernest was a member of the Bavarian noble Wittelsbach family. He was the third son of Duke Albert IV of Bavaria-Munich and his wife Kunigunde, daughter of Holy Roman Emperor Frederick III.

In 1506 Albert issued a Primogeniture Act, stipulating that Bavaria should remain undivided. The result was that his two younger sons Louis and Ernest were excluded from the government. Louis's parents decided that he should follow an ecclesiastical career instead.  After Albert died in 1508, the Bavarian court historian Johannes Aventinus was entrusted with providing Ernest with a suitable education.   Ernest and Louis travelled to Italy, here he worked in Pavia and attended lectures from the famous legal scholar Jason Magnus.  Ernest also travelled to Paris and to Saxony with John of Malentein, who later became Bishop of Seckau.

In 1515 Louis enrolled at the University of Ingolstadt.  He soon became a member of Sodalitas Ingolstatiensis, a literary society founded by Aventinus, after a suggestion by the Humanist Conrad Celtis.

Administrator of Passau 
With the support of Emperor Maximilian I the brothers William and Louis, succeeded in 1514 to have Ernest appointed Coadjutor of Bishop Wiguleus Fröschl of Marzoll in Passau. The papal confirmation the appointment on 28 January 1517.

Although Ernest had not been ordained, he was appointed Administrator of the Diocese of Passau after the death of Bishop Fröschl in 1517. Nevertheless, he did not give up his claim to the co-regency in the Duchy of Bavaria-Munich. His hereditary claims were supported by Archduke Ferdinand I.  The issue was finally settled in 1534 by the Treaty of Linz between the royal houses of Habsburg and Wittelsbach.

As administrator of Passau, Ernest turned against the followers of Martin Luther and against the Anabaptists.  In 1522, he participated in the Provincial Synod in Mühldorf am Inn and in 1527 he took part in the conference in Salzburg.  In 1524 he joined an alliance between the South German bishops, the dukes of Bavaria and the Archduke Ferdinand to enforce the Edict of Worms.  On his instigation, the Reformer Leonhard Kaiser was handed over to the secular authorities in 1527 and burned at the stake in Schärding, then part of the district of Burghausen.  In 1532, Ernest was present at the imperial Diet in Augsburg and in 1532 in Regensburg.

As an entrepreneur, Ernest participated in Bohemian mines and traded in precious metals. He carried out transactions to Vienna, Prague, Leipzig and Antwerp, and maintained close relations with the South German trading cities.

Administrator of Salzburg 
In accordance with the agreement from 1516, the brothers William and Louis sought to ensure that Ernest would be the next person to rule the Archdiocese of Salzburg.  In 1525, the made an agreement with the Salzburg cathedral chapter whereby Ernest was appointed coadjutor of the archbishop of Salzburg as compensation for the Bavarian help in the German Peasants' War.  The chapter duly proposed his appointment to the Pope, who rejected the proposal.  To enable a new appointment procedure, Ernest resigned from his position as administrator of the diocese of Passau.

After the death of Bishop Matthäus Lang von Wellenburg of Salzburg, Ernest was elected as administrator of Salzburg by the chapter on 21 April 1540.   The Pope confirmed his election on 21 May of that year, subject to the condition that within ten years, Ernest should be ordained as a priest or otherwise he would have to abandon the archdiocese. He took possession of the diocese on 12 October 1540.

In Salzburg, like before in Passau, Ernest was lenient towards the Protestant movement.  Perhaps an understanding of the intellectual and social causes of the Reformation may have played a role. He contributed little to the intellectual and spiritual revival of Catholicism; he recognized, however, the social and economic developments of his time.  He attended the Diet of Regensburg in 1541 and held provincial synods in 1544 and 1553.  He was a capable administrator: he brought order to the country's finances and introduced administrative reforms.  Like in Passau he loved economic enterprises. He was involved in Alpine mining, cattle and grain trade, and at dealing in coins.

Even as Archbishop-designate Ernest delayed his ordination.  In his will, dated 25 September 1550, he explained that he had never intended to become a priest.  He repeatedly asked the Pope for dispensation of the higher orders, but this was finally denied in 1554.  The Pope presented him with the choice of being ordained immediately or resignation.  Ernest opted to resign and on 16 July 1554 he left to his successor, Michael of Kuenburg.

Pledge Lord of Glatz 
When the end of his ecclesiastical career loomed, Ernest purchased the County of Glatz from John III of Pernstein in 1549.  In 1549, Glatz was considered part of Bohemia.  Included in the purchase was the Lordship of Hummel, which Ernest gave to his son Eustace on 10 December 1549.  Eustace was his illegitimate son, until he was legitimized as a noble descendant of Ernest by Pope Julius III in 1550.  In 1546, Ernest was accepted by the Estates of Bohemia as a landed subject.

Ernest settled permanently in Glatz in 1556.  He did not resume hist former economic and business activities.  Although he no longer held an ecclesiastical office, he committed himself to the Counter Reformation and in 1558, he and Emperor Ferdinand I, called a synod.  The primary aim of this synod was to test the beliefs of the clergy.  A questionnaire had been developed by the Cistercian abbots John of Grüssau and Leonhard of Fürstenfeld.

Ernest also reformed the administration of Glatz, employing qualified officials, whom he had brought with him from Salzburg and Bavaria.  He expanded the castle of Glatz.  His purchase of Glatz included the privilege to mint coins, so he started minting coins showing the Bohemian lion on one side and the coats of arms of Palatinate-Zweibrücken, the Duchy of Bavaria and the County of Glatz on the other side.

To round off his possessions, Ernest purchased in 1556 the East Bohemian Lordships of Rychnov nad Kněžnou, Litice Castle, Potštejn, Solnice and Černíkovice.

Ernest died in 1560 and was buried in Glatz.  A short time later, however, his body was transferred to Munich and buried in the Wittelsbach crypt in the Church of Our Lady.  The pledge lordship of Glatz was inherited by his nephew Albert V, who sold it to Maximilian II in 1567.

Ancestors

References

Sources 
 August Leidl, Franz Ortner, in: Erwin Gatz: Die Bischöfe des Heiligen Römischen Reiches 1448-1648, p. 160–163
 
 
 
 Hans und Marga Rall: Die Wittelsbacher in Lebensbildern. Munich, 2005, p. 114
 Arno Herzig, Małgorzata Ruchniewicz: Geschichte des Glatzer Landes, Hamburg/Wrocław, 2006, p. 66–70

Nobility from Munich
House of Wittelsbach
Dukes of Germany
1500 births
1560 deaths
16th-century German people
Burials at Munich Frauenkirche
Sons of monarchs